Funk Express is a studio album released in 1980 by the Washington, D.C.-based go-go band Chuck Brown & the Soul Searchers.

Track listing

Side A
"Come On and Boogie" (Part I - Vocal) – 4:56
"Come On and Boogie" (Part II - A Fantasy of Fusion) – 4:56
"In the Pocket" – 6:08
"Who Are You" – 3:20

Side B
"Sticks and Stones" – 6:04
"Time Has No Ending" – 3:49
"Slow Down (You Keep Telling Me)" – 4:32
"Keep That Same Old Feeling" – 6:55

Personnel
 Chuck Brown – lead vocals, electric guitar
 Jerry Wilder – bass guitar
 Gregory Gerran – congas, percussion
 Ricardo D. Wellman – drums
 Leroy Fleming – tenor saxophone, flute, timbales, background vocals
 Skip Fennell – keyboards
 Curtis Johnson - organ, keyboards
 John M. Buchannan – keyboards, trombone
 Donald Tillery – trumpet, background vocals

References

External links
 Funk Express at Discogs.com

1980 albums
Chuck Brown albums